Robert Keith Sawyer is an American psychologist. He is the Morgan Distinguished Professor in Educational Innovations at University of North Carolina at Chapel Hill. He is an expert on creativity, innovation and learning.

Books

Selected publications

References

External links
Faculty Page at UNC

1960 births
Living people
Creativity researchers
21st-century American psychologists
University of North Carolina at Chapel Hill faculty
University of Chicago alumni
Massachusetts Institute of Technology alumni
20th-century American psychologists